Jiang Hua (August 1, 1907 – December 24, 1999) was a Chinese politician and President of the Supreme People's Court of China.

Biography
Jiang Hua was born in Jianghua, Hunan.  He was the First Secretary of the Communist Party of China in Zhejiang, and was the President of the Supreme People's Court from 1975 to 1983. He was largely visible during the sentencing of the Gang of Four.

External links
 Jiang Hua's profile

1907 births
1999 deaths
People's Republic of China politicians from Hunan
Chinese Communist Party politicians from Hunan
Politicians from Yongzhou
Presidents of the Supreme People's Court
Mayors of Hangzhou
20th-century Chinese judges
Secretaries to Mao Zedong